La Bazoque may refer to:

 La Bazoque, Calvados, a commune in France
 La Bazoque, Orne, a commune in France